Verona (or ) is a city on the Adige River in Veneto, Italy, with 258,031 inhabitants. It is one of the seven provincial capitals of the region, and is the largest city municipality in the region and the second largest in northeastern Italy. It is one of the main tourist destinations in northern Italy because of its artistic heritage and several annual fairs and shows as well as the opera season in the Arena, an ancient Roman amphitheater.

Between the 13th and 14th century, the city was ruled by the della Scala Family. Under the rule of the family, in particular of Cangrande I della Scala, the city experienced great prosperity, becoming rich and powerful and being surrounded by new walls. The Della Scala era is survived in numerous monuments around Verona.

Two of William Shakespeare's plays are set in Verona: Romeo and Juliet (which also features Romeo's visit to Mantua) and The Two Gentlemen of Verona. It is unknown if Shakespeare ever visited Verona or Italy, but his plays have lured many visitors to Verona and surrounding cities. Verona was also the birthplace of Isotta Nogarola, who is said to be the first major female humanist and one of the most important humanists of the Renaissance. In November 2000 the city was declared a World Heritage Site by UNESCO because of its urban structure and architecture.

The city is scheduled to host the 2026 Winter Olympics closing ceremonies.

History

The precise details of Verona's early history remain a mystery along with the origin of the name. One theory is it was a city of the Euganei, who were obliged to give it up to the Cenomani (550 BC). With the conquest of the Valley of the Po, the Veronese territory became Roman (about 300 BC). Verona became a Roman colonia in 89 BC. It was classified as a municipium in 49 BC, when its citizens were ascribed to the Roman tribe Poblilia or Publicia.

The city became important because it was at the intersection of several roads. Stilicho defeated Alaric and his Visigoths here in 402. But, after Verona was conquered by the Ostrogoths in 489, the Gothic domination of Italy began. Theoderic the Great was said to have built a palace there. It remained under the power of the Goths throughout the Gothic War (535–552), except for a single day in 541, when the Byzantine officer Artabazes made an entrance. The defections of the Byzantine generals over the booty made it possible for the Goths to regain possession of the city. In 552 Valerian vainly endeavored to enter the city, but it was only when the Goths were fully overthrown that they surrendered it.

In 569, it was taken by Alboin, King of the Lombards, in whose kingdom it was, in a sense, the second most important city. There, Alboin was killed by his wife in 572. The dukes of Treviso often resided there. Adalgisus, son of Desiderius, in 774 made his last desperate resistance in Verona to Charlemagne, who had destroyed the Lombard kingdom. Verona became the ordinary residence of the kings of Italy, the government of the city becoming hereditary in the family of Count Milo, progenitor of the counts of San Bonifacio. From 880 to 951 the two Berengarii resided there.

Otto I ceded to Verona the marquisate dependent on the Duchy of Bavaria, however, the increasing wealth of the burgher families eclipsed the power of the counts, and in 1135 Verona was organised as a free commune. In 1164 Verona joined with Vicenza, Padua and Treviso to create the Veronese League, which was integrated with the Lombard League in 1167 to battle against Frederick I Barbarossa. Victory was achieved at the Battle of Legnano in 1176, and the Treaty of Venice signed in 1177 followed by the Peace of Constance in 1183.

When Ezzelino III da Romano was elected podestà in 1226, he converted the office into a permanent lordship. In 1257 he caused the slaughter of 11,000 Paduans on the plain of Verona (Campi di Verona). Upon his death, the Great Council elected Mastino I della Scala as podestà, and he converted the "signoria" into a family possession, though leaving the burghers a share in the government. Failing to be re-elected podestà in 1262, he affected a coup d'état, and was acclaimed Capitano del Popolo, with the command of the communal troops. Long internal discord took place before he succeeded in establishing this new office, to which was attached the function of confirming the podestà. In 1277, Mastino della Scala was killed by the faction of the nobles.

The reign of his son Alberto as capitano (1277–1302) was a time of incessant war against the counts of San Bonifacio, who were aided by the House of Este. Of his sons, Bartolomeo, Alboino and Cangrande I, only the last shared the government (1308); he was great as warrior, prince, and patron of the arts; he protected Dante, Petrarch, and Giotto. By war or treaty, he brought under his control the cities of Padua (1328), Treviso (1308) and Vicenza. At this time before the Black death the city was home to more than 40,000 people.

Cangrande was succeeded by Mastino II (1329–1351) and Alberto, sons of Alboino. Mastino continued his uncle's policy, conquering Brescia in 1332 and carrying his power beyond the Mincio. He purchased Parma (1335) and Lucca (1339). After the King of France, he was the richest prince of his time. But a powerful league was formed against him in 1337 – Florence, Venice, the Visconti, the Este, and the Gonzaga. After a three years war, the Scaliger dominions were reduced to Verona and Vicenza (Mastino's daughter Regina-Beatrice della Scala married to Barnabò Visconti). Mastino's son Cangrande II (1351–1359) was a cruel, dissolute, and suspicious tyrant; not trusting his own subjects, he surrounded himself with Brandenburg mercenaries. He was killed by his brother Cansignorio (1359–1375), who beautified the city with palaces, provided it with aqueducts and bridges, and founded the state treasury. He also killed his other brother, Paolo Alboino. Fratricide seems to have become a family custom, for Antonio (1375–1387), Cansignorio's natural brother, slew his brother Bartolomeo, thereby arousing the indignation of the people, who deserted him when Gian Galeazzo Visconti of Milan made war on him. Having exhausted all his resources, he fled from Verona at midnight (19 October 1387), thus putting an end to the Scaliger domination, which, however, survived in its monuments.

The year 1387 is also the year of the Battle of Castagnaro, between Giovanni Ordelaffi, for Verona, and John Hawkwood, for Padua, who was the winner.

Antonio's son Canfrancesco attempted in vain to recover Verona (1390). Guglielmo (1404), natural son of Cangrande II, was more fortunate; with the support of the people and the Carraresi, he drove out the Milanese, but he died ten days after. After a period of Cararrese rule, Verona submitted to Venice (1405). The last representatives of the Scaligeri lived at the imperial court and repeatedly attempted to recover Verona by the aid of popular risings.

From 1508 to 1517, the city was in the power of the Emperor Maximilian I. There were numerous outbreaks of the plague, and in 1629–1633, Italy was struck by its worst outbreak in modern times. Around 33,000 people died in Verona (over 60% of the population at the time) in 1630–1631.

In 1776, a method of bellringing was developed called Veronese bellringing art. Verona was occupied by Napoleon in 1797, but on Easter Monday the populace rose and drove out the French. It was then that Napoleon made an end of the Venetian Republic. Verona became Austrian territory when Napoleon signed the Treaty of Campo Formio in October 1797. The Austrians took control of the city on 18 January 1798. It was taken from Austria by the Treaty of Pressburg in 1805 and became part of Napoleon's Kingdom of Italy, but was returned to Austria following Napoleon's defeat in 1814, when it became part of the Austrian-held Kingdom of Lombardy–Venetia.

The Congress of Verona, which met on 20 October 1822, was part of the series of international conferences or congresses, opening with the Congress of Vienna in 1814–1815, that marked the continuing enforcement of the "Concert of Europe".

In 1866, following the Third Italian War of Independence, Verona, along with the rest of Venetia, became part of a united Italy.

The advent of fascism added another dark chapter to the annals of Verona. Throughout Italy, the Jewish population was hit by the Manifesto of Race, a series of anti-Semitic laws passed in 1938, and after the invasion by Nazi Germany in 1943, deportations to Nazi concentration camps. An Austrian Fort (now a church, the Santuario della Madonna di Lourdes), was used to incarcerate and torture Allied troops, Jews and anti-fascists, especially after 1943, when Verona became part of the Italian Social Republic.

As in Austrian times, Verona became of great strategic importance to the regime. Galeazzo Ciano, Benito Mussolini's son-in-law, was accused of plotting against the republic; in a show trial staged in January 1944 by the Nazi and fascist hierarchy at Castelvecchio (the Verona trial), Ciano was executed on the banks of the Adige with many other officers on what is today Via Colombo. This marked another turning point in the escalation of violence that would only end with the final liberation by allied troops and partisans on 26 April 1945. 

After World War II, as Italy joined the NATO alliance, Verona once again acquired its strategic importance, due to its geographical closeness to the Iron Curtain. The city became the seat of SETAF (South European Allied Terrestrial Forces) and had during the whole duration of the Cold War period a strong military presence, especially American, which has since decreased.

Geography

Climate
Verona has a humid subtropical climate characteristic of Northern Italy's inland plains, with hot summers and cool, humid winters, even though Lake Garda has a partial influence on the city. The relative humidity is high throughout the year, especially in winter when it causes fog, mainly from dusk until late morning, although the phenomenon has become less and less frequent in recent years.

Demographics

In 2009, 265,368 people were residing in Verona, located in the province of Verona, Veneto, of whom 47.6% were male and 52.4% were female. Minors (children aged 0–17) totaled 16.05% of the population compared to pensioners who number 22.36%. This compares with the Italian average of 18.06% (minors) and 19.94% (pensioners). The average age of Verona residents is 43 compared to the Italian average of 42. In the five years between 2002 and 2007, the population of Verona grew by 3.05%, while Italy as a whole grew by 3.85%. The current birth rate of Verona is 9.24 births per 1,000 inhabitants compared to the Italian average of 9.45 births.

, 87% of the population was Italian. The largest immigrant group comes from other European nations (the largest coming from Romania): 3.60%, South Asia: 2.03%, and sub-saharan Africa 1.50%. The city is predominantly Roman Catholic, but due to immigration now has some Orthodox Christian, and Muslim followers.

Government

Since the local government political reorganization in 1993, Verona has been governed by the City Council of Verona, which is based in Palazzo Barbieri. Voters elect directly 33 councilors and the Mayor of Verona every five years.

Verona is also the capital of its own province. The Provincial Council is seated in Palazzo del Governo. The current Mayor of Verona is Damiano Tommasi, elected on 26 June 2022.

Verona has traditionally been a right-wing traditionalist Catholic city, reflecting its former status as one of the major cities of Italian Social Republic, and the right-wing politics of the Veneto region. In October 2018, Verona became the first city in Italy to declare itself pro-life, and hosted the American Christian right lobby group World Congress of Families' conference in 2019. Despite this, since the mayors became directly elected in 1994, the city has elected two left-wing mayors - Paolo Zanotto in 2002 and current mayor Damiano Tommasi in 2022, largely due to incumbent mayor Federico Sboarina's refusal to include center-right parties in his right-wing coalition.

Main sights

Because of the value and importance of its many historical buildings, Verona has been named a UNESCO World Heritage Site. Verona preserved many ancient Roman monuments (including the magnificent Arena) in the early Middle Ages, but many of its early medieval edifices were destroyed or heavily damaged by the earthquake of 3 January 1117, which led to a massive Romanesque rebuilding. The Carolingian period Versus de Verona contains an important description of Verona in the early medieval era.

Roman edifices

The Roman military settlement in what is now the center of the city was to expand through the cardines and decumani that intersect at right angles. This structure has been kept to the present day and is clearly visible from the air. Further development has not reshaped the original map. Though the Roman city with its basalt-paved roads is mostly hidden from view it stands virtually intact about 6 m below the surface. Most palazzi and houses have cellars built on Roman structures that are rarely accessible to visitors. 
Piazza delle Erbe, near the Roman forum was rebuilt by Cangrande I and Cansignorio della Scala I, lords of Verona, using material (such as marble blocks and statues) from Roman spas and villas.

Verona is famous for its Roman amphitheater, the Arena, found in the city's largest piazza, the Piazza Bra. Completed around 30 AD, it is the third-largest in Italy after Rome's Colosseum and the arena at Capua. It measures 139 meters long and 110 meters wide, and could seat some 25,000 spectators in its 44 tiers of marble seats. The ludi (shows and gladiator games) performed within its walls were so famous that they attracted spectators from far beyond the city. The current two-story façade is actually the internal support for the tiers; only a fragment of the original outer perimeter wall in white and pink limestone from Valpolicella, with three stories remains. The interior is very impressive and is virtually intact, and has remained in use even today for public events, fairs, theatre, and open-aired opera during warm summer nights.

There is also a variety of other Roman monuments to be found in the town, such as the Roman theatre of Verona. This theatre was built in the 1st century BC, but through the ages had fallen in disuse and had been built upon to provide housing. In the 18th century Andrea Monga, a wealthy Veronese, bought all the houses that in time had been built over the theatre, demolished them, and saved the monument. Not far from it is the Ponte di Pietra ("Stone Wall Bridge"), another Roman landmark that has survived to this day.

The Arco dei Gavi (Gavi Arch) was built in the 1st century AD and is famous for having the name of the builder (architect Lucius Vitruvius Cordone) engraved on it, a rare case in the architecture of the epoque. It originally straddled the main Roman road into the city, now the Corso Cavour. It was demolished by French troops in 1805 and rebuilt in 1932.

Nearby is the Porta Borsari, an archway at the end of Corso Porta Borsari. This is the façade of a 3rd-century gate in the original Roman city walls. The inscription is dated 245 AD and gives the city name as Colonia Verona Augusta. Corso Porta Borsari, the road passing through the gate is the original Via Sacra of the Roman city. Today, it is lined with several Renaissance palazzi and the ancient Church of Santi Apostoli, a few meters from Piazza delle Erbe.

Porta Leoni is the 1st century BC ruin of what was once part of the Roman city gate. A substantial portion is still standing as part of the wall of a medieval building. The street itself is an open archaeological site, and the remains of the original Roman street and gateway foundations can be seen a few feet below the present street level. As can be seen from there, the gate contains a small court guarded by towers. Here, carriages and travelers were inspected before entering or leaving the city.

Santo Stefano church is dedicated to the first Christian martyr, was erected in the Paleochristian era, and houses the burials of the first bishops of Verona. Throughout the centuries Saint Stephen underwent complex architectural transformations. Particularly striking is the rare two-story ambulatory, probably built to give pilgrims visual access to the abundant collection of important relics for which the church was famous. Also to be visited is the cruciform crypt with its forest of columns, arches, and cross vaults. Saint Stephen was the first Christian martyr and, according to the Acts of the Apostles, was stoned just outside Jerusalem, in a place still remembered today, near the so-called "Porta Leoni".

Medieval architecture

The Basilica of San Zeno Maggiore is a Romanesque style church, the third such structure on its site, built from 1123–1135, over the 4th-century shrine to Verona's patron saint, St. Zeno (bishop of Verona from 362 to 380 when he died). The façade dominates the large square, and is flanked with a 72-meter-tall bell tower, which is mentioned by Dante in Canto 18 of Purgatory in the Divine Comedy. The weathered Veronese stone gives a warm golden glow, and the restrained lines of the pillars, columns, and cornices, and the gallery with its double windows, give the façade an air of harmonious elegance. The huge rose window is decorated as a Wheel of Fortune. The lintels above the portal have carvings of the months of the year. Each side of the doorway is embellished with 18 bas-relief panels of biblical scenes, and the inner bronze door panels have 48 primitive but forceful depictions of Biblical scenes and episodes from the life of St Zeno. The meaning of some of the scenes is now unknown, but the extraordinarily vivid energy of the figures is a superb blend of traditional and Ottonian influences. The interior of the church is divided into the Lower Church, occupying about ⅔ of the structure, and the Upper Church, occupying the remainder. The walls are covered with 12th and 14th century frescos and the ceiling of the nave is a magnificent example of a ship's keel ceiling. The vaulted crypt contains the tomb of St. Zeno, the first Bishop of Verona, as well as the tombs of several other saints. North of the church is a pleasant cloister. The church also houses the tomb of King Pippin of Italy (777–810).
The Basilica of San Lorenzo is another Romanesque church, albeit smaller. It dates from around 1177, but was built on the site of a Paleochristian church, fragments of which remain. The church is built of alternating tracks of brick and stone, and has two cylindrical towers, housing spiral staircases to the women's galleries. The interior is sober but still quiet. The striped bands of stone and brick and the graceful arches complement the setting.
Santa Maria Antica is a small Romanesque church that served as the private chapel of the Scaligeri clan, and is famous for the Gothic Scaliger Tombs. The Duomo is also a notable Romanesque church.
Sant'Anastasia is a huge and lofty church built from 1290–1481 by the Dominicans to hold the massive congregations attracted by their sermons. The Pellegrini chapel houses the fresco St. George and the Princess of Trebizond by Pisanello as well as the grave of Wilhelm von Bibra. An art festival is held in the square each may.

Notable people
Aleardo Aleardi (1812–1878), a poet
Berto Barbarani (1872–1945), poet
Paolo Bellasio (1554–1594), composer of the Renaissance; member of the Roman School
Stefano Bernardi (1580–1637), baroque composer
Massimo Bubola, singer-songwriter born in Terrazzo
Paolo Caliari (1528–1588), well known as "Veronese", painter
Lou Campi (1905–1989), professional bowler
Mario Capecchi (born 1937), Nobel prize in Medicine, 2007
Giovanni Francesco Caroto, painter
Catullus, Latin poet
Walter Chiari, actor
Gigliola Cinquetti, a singer who brought Italy its first Eurovision Song Contest win in 1964
Lorenzo Comendich, painter 
Damiano Cunego, former world number 1 cyclist and former Giro d'Italia winner
Giorgio de Stefani, tennis player, finalist at the 1932 French Open
Franco Donatoni, composer
Gino Fano, mathematician
Girolamo Fracastoro, also known as Fracastorius, renowned scholar, physician, and poet
Giovanni Giocondo, architect and scholar
Girolamo dai Libri, illuminator of manuscripts and painter
Romano Guardini, theologian
Claudio Guglielmoni, retired professional football player
Marc' Antonio Ingegneri, composer, teacher of Claudio Monteverdi
Ernestine von Kirchsberg, Austrian landscape painter
Cesare Lombroso, criminologist
Scipione Maffei, writer and historian
Matteo Manassero, British amateur golf champion, 2009
Arnoldo Mondadori, editor
Romeo Montague and Juliet Capulet, fictional characters from the well known Shakespearian play Romeo and Juliet
Marcantonio Negri, Baroque composer, associate of Monteverdi
Carlo Pedrotti, 19th-century composer, conductor, voice teacher, and opera administrator
St. Peter Martyr, Dominican preacher and saint
Ippolito Pindemonte, poet
Ratherius, Medieval bishop and writer
Francesca Rettondini, actress
Carlo Rovelli, physicist and writer
Vincenzo Ruffo, composer of the Renaissance
Emilio Salgari, novelist
Antonio Salieri, composer
Michele Sammicheli, architect
Sara Simeoni, the former world high jump primatist and Olympic gold medalist
Marco Stroppa, composer
Bartolomeo Tromboncino, composer of the Renaissance period
Giorgio Zancanaro, baritone
Achille Lauro, singer, rapper, and songwriter who will represent San Marino in the Eurovision Song Contest 2022
Verona was the birthplace of Catullus, and the town that Julius Caesar chose for relaxing stays. It has had an association with many important people and events that have been significant in the history of Europe, such as Theoderic the Great, king of Ostrogoths, Alboin and Rosamund, the Lombard Dukes, Charlemagne and Pippin of Italy, Berengar I, and Dante. Conclaves were held here, as were important congresses. Verona featured in the travel diaries of Goethe, Stendhal, Paul Valéry and Michel de Montaigne. The British writer Tim Parks has been living near Verona since the 1980s and the city is central to many of his books, notably A Season with Verona and Italian Neighbors.

Sport

The city has two professional football teams nowadays. Historically, the city's major team has been Hellas Verona. They won the Italian Serie A championship in 1984–85 and played in the European Cup the following year. Chievo Verona represented Chievo, a suburb of Verona, and were created in 1929. However, they ceased to exist in 2021 due to outstanding tax payments. As of the 2021–22 season, Hellas plays in the first division of Italian football, Serie A, while Virtus Verona, the other club in the city, plays in the Serie C. The teams of Hellas and Chievo contested the Derby della Scala and shared the 38,402-seater Stadio Marcantonio Bentegodi (now only home to Hellas due to the fold of Chievo), which was used as a venue at the 1990 FIFA World Cup.

Verona is home to the volleyball team Marmi Lanza Verona (now in Serie A1), the rugby team Franklin and Marshall Cus Verona Rugby (now in Serie A1), and the basketball team Scaligera Basket (now in Legadue).

The city has twice hosted the UCI Road World Championships, in 1999 (with Treviso as co-host) and in 2004. The city also regularly hosts stages of the Giro d'Italia annual cycling race. Verona also hosted the baseball world cup in 2009, and the Volleyball World Cup in September–October 2010. Verona is hosting the Volleyball Women's World Championship in September–October 2014.

Infrastructure and transport

Public transit

Public transit has been operated by the provincial public transport company, Azienda Trasporti Verona (ATV), since 2007. Trolleybuses replaced the trams which were themselves replaced by buses in 1975. A new trolleybus network is currently under review by ATV and is expected to open in 2022.

An incline lift, the Verona funicular, opened in 2017 and provides access from the Ponte Pietra to the Roman theatre museum and San Pietro Castle.

Railways

Verona lies at a major route crossing where the north-south rail line from the Brenner Pass to Rome intersects with the east-west line between Milan and Venice, giving the city rail access to most of Europe. In addition to regional and local services, the city is served by direct international trains to Zurich, Innsbruck, and Munich. ÖBB nightjet provides overnight sleeper service via Verona on its La Spezia to Wien and München lines.

Verona's main station is Verona Porta Nuova railway station, to the south of the city center. It is considered to be the ninth busiest railway station in Italy, handling approximately 68,000 passengers per day, or 25 million passengers per year.

There is a lesser station to the east of the city at Porta Vescovo, which used to be the main station in Verona, but now only receives trains between Venice and Porta Nuova.

Airport

It handles around 3 million passengers per year. It is linked to Porta Nuova railway station by a frequent bus service.

There are direct flights between Verona and Rome Fiumicino, Munich, Berlin, Moscow, Naples, Frankfurt, Catania, London Gatwick, Dublin, Palermo, Cork, Manchester, Liverpool and Cagliari among others.

International relations

Twin towns – sister cities
Verona is twinned with:

 Albany, United States
 Johannesburg, South Africa
 Munich, Germany
 Nagahama, Japan
 Nîmes, France
 Pula, Croatia
 Saint-Josse-ten-Noode, Belgium
 Salzburg, Austria

Friendship pacts
Verona has friendly relations with:

 Ayacucho, Peru
 Bethlehem, Palestine
 Corfu, Greece
 Detmold, Germany
 Fresno, United States
 Hangzhou, China
 Kazan, Russia
 Korçë, Albania
 Košice, Slovakia
 Kragujevac, Serbia
 Namwon, South Korea
 Ningbo, China
 Prilep, North Macedonia
 Ra'anana, Israel
 Tirana, Albania
 Zhuji, China
 Zintan, Libya

In popular culture
Two of William Shakespeare's plays,  Romeo and Juliet  and  The Two Gentlemen of Verona, are set in the city of Verona. No evidence suggests that Shakespeare had ever been to the city.

See also

Idea Verona, an Italian language, art, and culture school for foreigners visiting or living in Verona

References

External links

Official website of Verona municipality

 
Burial sites of the Gausian dynasty
Cities and towns in Veneto
Domini di Terraferma
Territories of the Republic of Venice
World Heritage Sites in Italy